Pablo Eduardo Caballero Sebastiani (born 21 November 1987) is a Uruguayan professional footballer who plays as a midfielder for Sud América.

Club career
In 2013, Caballero played for Reggina.

Cobreloa
On 22 December 2019, it was reported that Primera B de Chile side Cobreloa hired to Caballero. He made his debut on 13 January 2020 in a 2–0 home loss against Deportes Temuco. On 1 March, he scored his first goal in a 3–1 win to San Marcos de Arica.

On 9 March 2020, Caballero failed a penalty against A.C. Barnechea once his shoot was saved by German keeper Robert Moewes in a 2–2 away draw played in Barnechea Municipal Stadium. Then, Caballero rebuked Moewes as a result of his impotence whilst the German goalkeeper shouted him his failure in his face.

He netted his second goal on 6 January 2021 in a 6–0 home thrash over Deportes Valdivia, being his score the first one of the game.

References

External links
 
 

1987 births
Living people
Footballers from Montevideo
Uruguayan footballers
Association football midfielders
Uruguayan Primera División players
Serie A players
Ecuadorian Serie A players
Primera B de Chile players
C.A. Cerro players
Defensor Sporting players
Reggina 1914 players
C.S.D. Independiente del Valle footballers
Racing Club de Montevideo players
Murciélagos FC footballers
Liverpool F.C. (Montevideo) players
Cobreloa footballers
Uruguayan expatriate footballers
Uruguayan expatriate sportspeople in Italy
Expatriate footballers in Italy
Uruguayan expatriate sportspeople in Colombia
Expatriate footballers in Colombia
Uruguayan expatriate sportspeople in Mexico
Expatriate footballers in Mexico
Uruguayan expatriate sportspeople in Chile
Expatriate footballers in Chile